Port Mulgrave is:

 Port Mulgrave, North Yorkshire a hamlet within the civil parish of Hinderwell of North Yorkshire, England
 an 18th-century name for Yakutat Bay
 a 19th-century name for Mulgrave, Nova Scotia